Willy Fitz (12 March 1918 – 25 September 1993) was an Austrian footballer and coach.

References

External links
 DFB 
 

1918 births
1993 deaths
Austrian footballers
German footballers
Germany international footballers
Association football forwards
SK Rapid Wien players
First Vienna FC players
Panathinaikos F.C. players
Austrian football managers
AEL Limassol managers
Place of birth missing